King Fook Holdings Limited is a holding company engaging in jewellery retailing and wholesaling operations in Hong Kong. Its businesses cover gold ornaments, jewellery, watch, fashion and gift retailing, bullion trading, securities brokerage and diamond wholesaling.

The company was established in 1949. It was listed on the Hong Kong Stock Exchange in 1988. Its subsidiary companies include King Fook Gold & Jewellery Company Limited, King Fook Jewellery Group Limited and King Fook Securities Company Limited.

King Fook Securities Company Limited (founded 1971) ceased its operation on July 31, 2013 due to consistent losses in successive prior financial years.

References

External links
King Fook Holdings Limited

Companies listed on the Hong Kong Stock Exchange
Holding companies established in 1949
Henderson Land Development
Retail companies of China
Conglomerate companies of China
Conglomerate companies of Hong Kong
Hong Kong brands